Aitutaki, also traditionally known as Araura and Utataki, is the second most-populated island in the Cook Islands, after Rarotonga. It is an "almost atoll", with fifteen islets in a lagoon adjacent to the main island. A major tourist destination, Aitutaki is the second most visited island of the Cook Islands.

Aitutaki had a population of 1,712 in 2016. The main village is Arutanga (Arutunga) on the west side.

Geography

Aitutaki is sometimes described as an "almost atoll", for it consists of a lagoon within an encircling atoll, with a significant area of high land on one side. The Ootu Peninsula, protruding east from the main island in a southerly direction along the eastern rim of the reef, takes up  out of the main island. Satellite image measurement suggests that the larger figure also includes the reef flat, which is commonly not considered part of a lagoon.

The barrier reef that forms the basis of Aitutaki is roughly the shape of an equilateral triangle with sides  in length. The southern edge of the triangle is almost totally below the surface of the ocean, and the eastern side is composed of a string of small islands including Mangere, Akaiami, and Tekopua.

The western side of the atoll contains many of Aitutaki's important features including a boat passage through the barrier reef allowing for anchorage close to shore at Arutanga. Towards the south of the side is a small break in the barrier reef, allowing access for small boats to the lagoon which covers most of the southern part of the triangle. Further to the north is the bulk of the main island. Its fertile volcanic soil provides tropical fruits and vegetables. Two of Aitutaki's 15 islets (motus) are also volcanic. The rest are made of coral.

Aitutaki Airport is located close to the triangle's northern point. The southeastern part of the lagoon near Akaiami used to be used as a landing area for TEAL flying boats on the "coral route".

History

Polynesians first settled Aitutaki around AD 1225–1430. They maintained voyaging contact over a wide area, for the geochemical source of basalt adze heads found in this island can be traced back to quarries on Samoa to the west and the Society Islands to the east. According to oral tradition, the island was named by Te Erui, who raised it from the ocean after traveling from Avaiki. Other traditions identify various settlers, including Ru, Te Munakorero, Kai, Ui-tario, and Ruatapu.

The first known European contact was with Captain Bligh and the crew of  when they also arrived in Aitutaki on 11 April 1789, prior to the infamous mutiny.

Aitutaki was the first of the Cook Islands to accept Christianity, after London Missionary Society (LMS) missionary John Williams visited in 1821. The oldest church in the country, the Cook Islands Christian Church in Arutanga, was built by Papeiha (Bora Bora) and Vahapata (Raiatea), two LMS teachers Williams had left behind.

On 8–9 October 1900 seven instruments of cession of Rarotonga and other islands were signed by their chiefs and people; and by a British Proclamation issued at the same time the cessions were accepted, the islands being declared parts of Her Britannic Majesty's dominions. Uniquely, these instruments did not include Aitutaki. It appears that, though the inhabitants of Aitutaki regarded themselves as British subjects, the Crown's title was uncertain, and the island was formally annexed by Proclamation dated 9 October 1900. It was the only island in the Cook Islands that was annexed rather than ceded.

In 1942 New Zealand and American forces were stationed on the island. The American engineering firm Sverdrup & Parcel, the New Zealand Ministry of Works, US military personnel and many locals combined to build two airstrips which were completed on 14 November 1942. This airport, and one on the northernmost Penrhyn Island, were to be used as bases by the Allies during World War II. The first aircraft, an American light bomber, landed on 22 November 1942. When the war ended some of the servicemen remained and married the locals.

During the 1950s Aitutaki's lagoon was used as a stopover for TEAL (Tasman Empire Airways Limited) flying boats on the famous Coral Route. The islet of Akaiami was used as a resting stop for passengers, who often lay about until the aircraft was refueled for two hours. These operations ceased in 1960, and the only reminder are the remains of the purpose-built jetty on Akaiami. The flying boat Aranui, which was part of this service, is now on display at the Museum of Transport and Technology in Auckland, New Zealand.

Commercial banana-growing was introduced to the island in the late 1960s, but suffered a rapid decline due to wind damage, low prices, and inadequate shipping. The industry was revived in the late 1970s, but collapsed after New Zealand adopted Rogernomics and removed privileged market access. A tourism boom began in the early 1990s, with tourist numbers doubling to 10,000 visitors a year in 1994.

On 10–11 February 2010, Aitutaki was hit by Cyclone Pat. The high winds of the storm ripped the roofs off of most houses and damaged other buildings including a school and a hospital. At least 60% of houses were damaged. There were no reported deaths but a few minor injuries were reported. An Air Force Hercules cargo plane and an army engineering team were provided by New Zealand along with an initial $200,000. Cook Island MP Teina Bishop said "New Zealand aid should have been sent to the devastated area much sooner".

In June 2010 the island was nominated "the world's most beautiful island" by Tony Wheeler the founder of Lonely Planet travel guide.

The delegates of the 2012 Pacific Islands Forum, which had its main venue in Rarotonga, travelled to One Foot Island for a 2-day retreat.

Demographics and settlement

The population of Aitutaki was 1,941 in 2016.

Aitutaki is subdivided in 8 districts. The districts are further subdivided into 19 tapere (land holdings by tribe lineages).

The eight villages are:
Amuri (Te Upoko Enua)
Ureia (Uriuri A Punga)
Arutanga (Rutanga O Te Toa)
Reureu (Te Mata O Teerui)
Nikaupara (Te Maru O Toi)
Vaipae (Te Vaipaepae O Pau)
Tautu (Titi Ai Tonga)
Vaipeka (Te Arekarioi)

The eight districts are subdivided into 19 tapere as follows:
Amuri District
Amuri Tapere
Punganui Tapere
Anaunga District
Anaunga Tapere
Punoa Tapere
Arutanga District
Arutanga Tapere
Reureu Tapere
Nukunoni Tapere
Ureia Tapere
Avanui District
Avanui Tapere
Vaipeka Tapere
Taravao District
Taravao Tapere
Vaiau Tapere
Vaiorea Tapere
Tautu District
Mataotane Tapere
Tautu Tapere
Vaipae District
Oako Tapere
Vaipae Tapere
Vaitupa District
Taakarere Tapere
Vaitupa Tapere

Culture

Sport
The most popular sport on Aitutaki is Rugby union and netball, followed closely by volleyball. With a population of 2,000 residing on the island and 50,000 overseas, there are four clubs on Aitutaki and eight teams (each club having a first team and a reserve team). The best players on the island play for the Aitutaki island team against their main rivals Rarotonga.

Education
Araura College is the only secondary school on Aitutaki. The school has the role of teaching approximately 200 students from Year 7 (Form 1) to Year 13 (Form 7).

The island has two government schools and one church school: Araura Primary school, Vaitau Primary School and Tekaaroa Primary School. Tekaaroa Primary School is a private special character school which is the designated Seventh Day Adventist (SDA) school. Araura Primary is the larger of the primary schools, catering for the mostly populated part of the island and Vaitau Primary caters mostly for the Vaipae and Tautu villages. Tekaaroa Primary School caters for the Seventh Day Adventist children on the island.

Economy
Aitutaki is the second largest tourist destination in the Cook Islands, after Rarotonga, receiving 38,777 visitors in 2018. As a result, tourism dominates the economy, with 36% of the labour force employed in the restaurant and accommodation sector.  The government is the next largest employer, employing 21%, with retail and wholesale employing 18% and agriculture, forestry and fishing 6%.

Aitutaki is connected to the rest of the Cook Islands by Aitutaki Airport and a port at Arutanga. In September 2020 Aitutaki was connected to the Manatua One Polynesia Fibre Cable, becoming one of the smallest fibre-connected islands in the world.

Since 2000 Aitutaki has served as a filming location for a variety of TV shows, including Shipwrecked, Survivor: Cook Islands, and Survivorman.

In 2019 a 750 kW solar array was installed as part of a plan to transition the island to 100% renewable energy.

Ecology

Flora
The flora of Aitutaki is highly modified, and on the main island only a few patches of degraded native forest survive near the airstrip. The main island's ecology can be divided into four zones. The coastal flat is dominated by Guettarda speciosa, coconuts, Hibiscus, Pandanus, and Hernandia moerenhoutiana. The slopes are mostly Hibiscus tiliaceus interspersed with taro patches. The inland plateau is extensively cultivated, with plantations of coconuts, banana, citrus, and other food plants, as well as assorted introduced decorative shrubs. The high ground on the island was cleared during World War 2 for military installations and now consists of grasses and weedy species. The motu have Pemphis acidula scrub on the seaward side, phasing to Suriana scrub and coconut forest, with the volcanic islands containing forests of Calophyllum inophyllum which are not found on the other motu.

Fauna
Aitutaki is home to numerous species of sea- and shorebirds, including the red-tailed tropicbird, white-tailed tropicbird, brown booby, great frigatebird, brown noddy, black noddy, white tern, and Pacific reef heron. Land birds include the common myna and the blue lorikeet. The latter were badly affected by Cyclone Pat, losing over 50% of their population and virtually all juveniles. Subfossil remains show that Kuhl's lorikeet, the spotless crake, and an undescribed species of whistling duck were all at one stage extant on Aitutaki before being extirpated. The main island has been designated an Important Bird Area (IBA) by BirdLife International because it supports a population of blue lorikeets.

Minor islands of Aitutaki

The main island of Aitutaki occupies the northern part of the atoll, which is roughly triangular in shape. The minor islands form part of the perimeter of the lagoon. All islands, including the main island and its peninsula Ootu, are listed starting clockwise from the northernmost point of the atoll:

Tapuaetai (One Foot Island), a small islet in the south-east of the lagoon, is often said to be the most important attraction. It is regarded as providing the visitor with the best views of the Aitutaki lagoon and, depending on the tide, one is able to walk on a sandbank a decent distance away from Tapuaetai. The trip to this island is the most frequented trip available on Aitutaki. One Foot Island was awarded "Australasia's Leading Beach" at the World Travel Awards held in Sydney in June 2008.

Ootu Peninsula is of coral formation, but attached to the main volcanic island, thus a peninsula. If it were an island, it would be the largest of the minor islands. Ootu Peninsula does belong to tapere and district of Vaitupa. The minor islands are not allocated to any districts or tapere, but they do form part of the larger constituencies.

All minor islets, except Akitua and Maina, are part of Vaipae–Tautu Constituency. Akitua is part of Amuri–Ureia Constituency, as is Ootu Peninsula, just north of Akitua. Maina is part of Arutanga–Reureu–Nikaupara Constituency. The main island is equally divided among the three constituencies Arutanga-Reureu-Nikaupara (southwest), Vaipae-Tautu (southeast), and Amuri-Ureia (north).

References

External links

Cook Islands website – Aitutaki
Aitutaki website by a long term resident
Aitutaki Photo Gallery
"Aitutaki – One of the World's favourite islands..." , Air Rarotonga
An open access archive collection of index cards of plant and animal names of the Cook Islands at Kaipuleohone includes information on Aitutaki.

 
Atolls of the Cook Islands
Islands of Aitutaki
Important Bird Areas of the Cook Islands